Reeder is an English and German surname. Notable people with the surname include the following:

 Andrew Horatio Reeder (1807-1864), first governor of the Territory of Kansas
 Annika Reeder (born 1979), British artistic gymnast
 Bertha S. Reeder (1892-1982), American Mormon missionary
 Carolyn Reeder, American author
 Conrad Reeder (born 1954), Recording artist, singer songwriter and playwright
 Dan Reeder (born 1961), American former footballer
 Eggert Reeder (1894—1959), German civil servant and Nazi administrator
 Francis Reeder (1850-1908), English-born New Zealand cricketer
 Icicle Reeder (1858-1913), American Major League baseball player 
 J. G. Reeder, fictional character in stories by Edgar Wallace
 Jim Reeder (1925-1972), American baseball player
 Joe R. Reeder (born 1947), American lawyer
 John R. Reeder (1914-2009), American botanist
 Kat Reeder, Peruvian-American artist
 Levi Branson Reeder (1865-?), U.S. attorney and Republican politician
 Mark Reeder (born 1958), British musician and record producer
 Pierre De Reeder (born 1973), American musician
 Russell Reeder (1902-1998), U.S. Army officer and author
 Scott Reeder (bassist) (born 1965), American bass player
 Scott Reeder (drummer), American drummer
 Scott Reeder (artist) (born 1970), American artist and filmmaker
 Troy Reeder (born 1994), American football player
 William A. Reeder (1849-1929), American Representative from Kansas

See also
 Rehder
 Reder
 Reader (surname)

English-language surnames
German-language surnames